Los Angeles Nurses' Club is a clubhouse and apartment building for nurses located in the Westlake district of Central Los Angeles, California.

History
The large building was built in 1924 by the Los Angeles Nurses' Club.  The club was organized and incorporated as a non-profit corporation in 1921.

The club's members conducted several bazaars, some theatre parties, and a dance, raising funds to buy a lot, which they then sold for a profit.  By 1923, the club had raised sufficient funds to purchase a hilltop lot at the corner of Third Street and Lucas Street, west of Downtown Los Angeles in the Westlake district.

The clubhouse was intended to provide a place "where registered nurses may live and enjoy the few quiet hours spared from their arduous duties."

Building
Architect John J. Frauenfelder was hired to design the building.  Frauenfelder designed a structure consisting of four stories and a basement.  The ground floor had a large living room with a library and fireplace, which was intended to lend a "home-like atmosphere to the clubhouse."  Frauenfelder's plans also included an auditorium for lectures and motion pictures.  A garden was built at the rear of the building with views of the mountains.  The structure included housing for 100 nurses and was also the headquarters of the group's professional activities, including the city's Central Registry for nurses.

When completed in 1924, the building was the first clubhouse in the United States to be entirely financed and built by and for nurses.  The cost of building the structure was $160,000.  The "Angelus Sextette", composed of nurses from the Angelus Hospital, sang at the dedication ceremony in 1924.

Landmark
The Los Angeles Nurses' Club building was designated a Los Angeles Historic-Cultural Monument by the Los Angeles Cultural Heritage Board in April 1988 (HCM #352). It was listed on the National Register of Historic Places in 1995.

See also
 List of Los Angeles Historic-Cultural Monuments in the Wilshire and Westlake areas
 National Register of Historic Places listings in Los Angeles

References

External links
 You-are-here.com: Photograph of Nurses' Club

Clubhouses in California
Women's club buildings in California
Apartment buildings in Los Angeles
Westlake, Los Angeles
Clubs and societies in California
Nursing in the United States
Women's clubs in the United States
Buildings and structures completed in 1924
Los Angeles Historic-Cultural Monuments
Clubhouses on the National Register of Historic Places in Los Angeles
Residential buildings on the National Register of Historic Places in Los Angeles
History of women in California
Women in Los Angeles